Morgan William II O'Donovan   (1861–1940), The O'Donovan, and assumed the designation of The O'Donovan from 1890 to his death in 1940. He was the son of Henry Winthrop O'Donovan, The O'Donovan, and Amelia O'Grady, daughter of Gerald de Courcy O'Grady, The O'Grady, and Anne Wise. O'Donovan was a descendant of Donal II O'Donovan, The O'Donovan of Clancahill, the last such to be formally inaugurated in the ancient Gaelic manner, with the White Rod, by the MacCarthy Reagh, Prince of Carbery.

Career
O'Donovan graduated from Magdalen College with a Bachelor of Arts. His first civic office, following his accession to the chiefship, was that of High Sheriff of County Cork in 1892.

He was an officer in the 3rd (Militia) Battalion of the Royal Munster Fusiliers (until 1881 known as the South Cork Light Infantry), where he was appointed major on 4 December 1891. Following the outbreak of the Second Boer War in October 1899, the battalion was embodied in December 1899, and embarked the SS Sumatra for South Africa on 23 February 1900. From arrival in March 1900 until 1902, he took part in operations in the Transvaal, Orange River Colony, and Cape Colony, and was mentioned in despatches. From 1903 to 1914 O'Donovan was Colonel of the 4th Battalion (Extra Reserve), Royal Munster Fusiliers.

He was also justice of the peace and deputy lieutenant for County Cork.

In 1911 he was invested as a Companion of the Order of the Bath (Civil Division).

Marriage and issue
O'Donovan married Mary Eleanor Barton, daughter of Reverend John Yarker Barton, and they had issue:

 Morgan John Winthrop O'Donovan, The O'Donovan, his successor
 Eleanor Melian Frances O'Donovan, Licentiate in Medicine and Surgery, died unmarried.
 Miles Henry O'Donovan, Captain of the Royal Munster Fusiliers, fought in the First World War, killed in action 1916.
 Victor Teige O'Donovan, Lieutenant in the Royal Field Artillery, fought in the First World War and was invalided. Issue one son and one daughter.

Notes

References

 Burke, Bernard, and Hugh Montgomery-Massingberd, Burke's Irish Family Records. London: Burke's Peerage Ltd. 5th edition, 1976.
 Butler, W. F. T., "The Barony of Carbery", in Journal of the Cork Historical and Archaeological Society, Volume X, Second Series. 1904. pp. 1–10, 73–84.
 Sir Richard Cox, 1st Baronet, Carberiae Notitia. 1686. extracts published in Journal of the Cork Historical and Archaeological Society, Volume XII, Second Series. 1906. pp. 142–9
 Crisp, Frederick Arthur, Visitation of Ireland, Volume 4. Privately printed. 1904. Pedigree of O'Donovan of Clan Cathal, pp. 55–6
 Curley, Walter J.P., Vanishing Kingdoms: The Irish Chiefs and their Families. Dublin: Lilliput Press. 2004.
 O'Donovan, John (ed. & tr.), Annála Ríoghachta Éireann. Annals of the Kingdom of Ireland by the Four Masters, from the Earliest Period to the Year 1616. 7 vols. Dublin: Royal Irish Academy. 1848–51. 2nd edition, 1856. Volume VI, Appendix, Pedigree of O'Donovan, pp. 2430–83.

External links
 

Morgan
British Army personnel of the Second Boer War
Companions of the Order of the Bath
Deputy Lieutenants of County Cork
Royal Munster Fusiliers officers
High Sheriffs of County Cork
Irish justices of the peace
1861 births
1940 deaths
Irish chiefs of the name